Gil Goldstein (born November 6, 1950 in Baltimore, Maryland) is an American jazz pianist and accordionist. He has won 5 Grammy Awards and he was nominated 8 times .

Biography
He began studying accordion at age 5 after noticing it in The Lawrence Welk Show and stating he instantly connected with it personally, but later moved on to cello and piano at age 10. He studied at the Berklee College of Music and by 1973 was working with Pat Martino and Lee Konitz. He started with the Gil Evans Orchestra in the early 1980s and also worked with Wayne Shorter, Billy Cobham, and Jim Hall. He returned to accordion for an album by Michel Petrucciani and occasionally uses it on his solo albums. As an accordionist he toured with Richard Galliano in 2000 but also played piano on the tour. During the 1980s and 90s he was a member of the group Elements.

In 1990 he toured Germany with the Blues Brothers, temporarily replacing Leon Pendarvis on keyboards.

In 2007 he released the album The Music of Elton John (ObliqSound, 2007) with Steve Swallow, Paul Motian, and Italian saxophonist Pietro Tonolo. The quartet performed jazz arrangements of some of Elton John's most popular songs.

Goldstein composed music for the films Radio Inside (1994) and Simply Irresistible (1999). He performed "I Love Paris" in the film De-Lovely. Two of his Grammy Awards were for his production and arrangement credits for the album Wide Angles by Michael Brecker. He has taught at New York University.

Discography

As leader

Sources:

As sideman
With Apostolis Anthimos
 Days We Can't Forget (GOWI, 1994)

With Billy Cobham
 Stratus (INAK, 1981)

With Eliane Elias
 The Three Americas (Blue Note, 1996)

With Gil Evans
 Bud and Bird (Electric Bird/King, 1986 [1987])
 Farewell (Evidence, 1986 [1992])
 Live at Umbria Jazz (Appecorsa, 1987)

With Letizia Gambi
 Introducing Letizia Gambi (Jando Music|Via Veneto Jazz, 2012)
 Blue Monday (RP Records, 2016)

With Jim Hall
 All Across the City (Concord Jazz, 1989)
 Dialogues (Telarc, 1995)

With Miho Hazama
 Time River (Sunnyside, 2015)

With Pat Martino
 Exit (Muse, 1976)
 We'll Be Together Again (Muse, 1976)
 Starbright (Warner Bros., 1976)

With Romero Lubambo
 Infinite Love (Big World Music, 1993)

With Tiger Okoshi
Echoes of a Note (JVC, 1993)
Two Sides to Every Story (JVC, 1994)

With Toninho Horta
 Foot On The Road (Verve, 1994)

With Pat Metheny
 Secret Story (Geffen, 1992)
 A Map of the World (Warner Bros., 1999)

With Wallace Roney
Mistérios (Warner Bros., 1994)

See also 
 List of music arrangers

References

External links 
 Official website
 NYU page
 Berklee College of Music press release
 Artist direct
 Hollywood.com

1950 births
American accordionists
American jazz pianists
American male pianists
Berklee College of Music alumni
Grammy Award winners
Living people
Jewish American musicians
Muse Records artists
20th-century American pianists
21st-century accordionists
21st-century American pianists
20th-century American male musicians
21st-century American male musicians
American male jazz musicians
Elements (band) members
SFJAZZ Collective members